Gujar Garhi [Home of Gujjar] is a village and is the largest union council in Mardan District of Khyber Pakhtunkhwa. It is located at 34°14'0N 72°1'0E and has an altitude of 298m (980 feet).This village is famous for agricultural engineering. The population is divided in many tribes. The main tribe is Gujjar consisting of almost 50 per cent of the village population other big tribes are Baba Khel,  Miangan,Piran,Lodhi,kashmiri and some other tribes of yousafzai.
gujar gari is very famous for steel industry in the provence.many steel goods supplies all over kpk.

References

Union councils of Mardan District
Populated places in Mardan District